Avidia Bank is a mutual community bank headquartered in Hudson, Massachusetts and founded in 2007. The bank was formed from the merger agreement between Hudson Savings Bank and Westborough Bank, both founded in 1869.

History
Avidia Bank was formed as a result of a merger between Hudson Savings Bank and Westborough Bank. This merger arose from an agreement between Assabet Valley Bancorp, the parent of Hudson Savings Bank, and Westborough Financial Services Inc., the owner of Westborough Bank.

The agreement stated that all employees would retain employment, the mutual holding company Westborough Financial Services Inc. would be eliminated, and there would be a complete name change of the newly established financial institution. It was also decided that the bank would be headquartered in Hudson, MA.

Avidia Bank founded the Avidia Charitable Foundation in July 1997 to support non-profit organizations. These organizations included hospitals and organizations involved with education, legal aid, baseball, and human services, such as the River's Edge Arts Alliance and UMass Memorial Health Care.

During mid-2019, Avidia Bank rebranded with a modified logo, new colors, and a new tagline, "Honest to Goodness TM." It also released two new commercials featuring new characters including a :40 second commercial and a :20 second commercial.

In August 2019, Avidia Bank partnered with Stephon Gilmore for Be a Champion for a Child where they would award two tickets to every home game to a mentor and mentee from the Boys and Girls Clubs of MetroWest.  Also during the 2019 NFL season, for every turnover made by the New England Patriots during their regular season games, the bank would donate $1000 up to $30,000 to the Boys and Girls Clubs of MetroWest.

In October 2019, Avidia Bank announced a partnership with Brad Marchand for Assists for Kids, which would help provide hockey safety equipment and $150 to youth savings account to help local children in MetroWest Massachusetts afford hockey.  For every assist made during the regular season, Avidia Bank donates $25 up to a total of $30,000.

Awards and recognition
Avidia Bank was named the 2017 Digital Edge 50 Award winner for how it promoted the launch of its Cardless Cash initiative. Avidia Bank is known for its use of brand advocacy with employees, the Avidia Smarties, and has been noted as having one of the top 35 banking websites across the globe.

Avidia Bank was recognized by FIS in their 2019 Innovation Awards for its use of FIS APIs and the NYCE payment network to speed settlement of payments for merchant processors. Avidia’s solution, called Instant Merchant Settlement, has helped its merchant customers enhance liquidity, while also providing the bank with a new source of fee income.

In May, 2019, Avidia Bank was the first community bank to implement real time payments through its partnership with The Clearing House.

References

External links
Official website

Banks based in Massachusetts
Banks established in 2007
2007 establishments in Massachusetts
Hudson, Massachusetts